The Jean Piaget University of Cape Verde is a private university in Cape Verde. The university is named after the famous Swiss child psychologist and philosopher Jean Piaget. The university was established on 7 May 2001, and now has about 2,000 students and 380 academic staff.

The main campus is in the capital city Praia (Palmarejo subdivision) on the island of Santiago, with a smaller second location in Mindelo on the island of São Vicente, opened in 2005. Jean Piaget University offers both undergraduate and graduate degrees, as well as continuing education courses.

Notable alumni
José Ulisses Correia e Silva, now prime minister lectured at the university.  Former teachers included Janira Hopffer Almada who later became a politician from 2014 to 2016.

Faculties
Science and Technology
Health Science and Environment
Political Science
Economy and Commerce

Praia Campus
Architecture
Biology
Civil Construction Engineering
Clinical Analyses and Public Health
Communications Sciences
Countability, Auditory and Business Enterprises
Electotechnical Engineering and Industrial Management
Ecology and Development
Ecology and Management
Educational Sciences
Hotel and Touristic Management
Management Information
Nursing
Pharmaceutical Sciences
Physiotherapy
Public Administration and Autarchy
Social Services
Sociology
Systems and Informative Engineering
Tradition and Multicultural

Mindelo Campus

Architecture
Educational Sciences
Management Information
Public Administration and Autarchy
Social Services
Systems and Informative Engineering

High Professional Studies Course
Development on Web and Mobile Applications
Masotherapy
Health Community and Endemic Control

Rectors
Marco Ribeiras Limas (in 2012)
Osvaldo Borges (in 2013 and 2014)
Jorge Sousa Brito (2014-2017)
Wlodzimierz Szymaniak (since 2017)

See also
University of Cape Verde
Jean Piaget University of Angola - sister campus on the African mainland

References

External links
 

Universities in Cape Verde
Education in Santiago, Cape Verde
Education in São Vicente, Cape Verde
Praia
Mindelo
Educational institutions established in 2001
2001 establishments in Cape Verde